The Skyland Special was a long distance named night train of the Southern Railway from Asheville, North Carolina, to Jacksonville, Florida, USA. Apart from the Southern's trains originating in Cincinnati, the Skyland Special was distinctive as an all-Southern Railway operation (without the co-operation of another rail carrier) going directly to Florida. It was also one of the few Southern Railway trains making a direct north-south route through South Carolina. In early years, the train had sections that continued to various destinations in Florida.

Predecessor train
The train was preceded in the 1920s by a lengthier incarnation with a similar name and a much longer and more complicated route, the Land of the Sky Special. This train had originating points in the north, in Cincinnati and St. Louis; the sections linked at Danville, Kentucky and proceeded south to Knoxville, Tennessee. Another section linked from Nashville to Knoxville. From there the train continued to Asheville, and then followed the route that the Skyland Special took for three decades.

Latter years of service
During World War II the Skyland Special went out of service. It returned in 1947. Two years later the train terminated in Jacksonville. Passengers wishing to go to St. Petersburg or Miami changed to Florida East Coast Railway or Seaboard Air Line Railroad coaches bound for those destinations in Jacksonville. The train lost its mail contract in 1957 and the Southern cancelled the train altogether from its schedule by August 1958.

Notes

Night trains of the United States
Passenger rail transportation in Florida
Passenger rail transportation in Georgia (U.S. state)
Passenger rail transportation in North Carolina
Passenger rail transportation in South Carolina
Railway services introduced in 1927
Passenger trains of the Southern Railway (U.S.)
Named passenger trains of the United States
Railway services discontinued in 1958